Dao is the sword of the Naga people and Mizo people of Northeastern India, mainly in the Indian states of Nagaland, Mizoram, Manipur and Assam. The sword, with its wooden hilt, and unique square form is used for digging as well as used in historical warfare. In modern times, it is generally used for cutting meat and wood.

Form
The dao broadsword can be found in Nagaland, Manipur, Arunachal Pradesh, Mizoram and Assam in the northeastern region of India where the Naga and Mizo peoples live. The unique design of this long backsword is that, instead of a point, the tip of the sword is a bevel which creates the appearance of a squarish shape. This form is also found in the Burmese dha, which is derived from the dao. The form of the dao was first adopted by the Kachin people. From here the form would evolve to the more elongated dha.

The blade of the dao is almost straight, with a very minimal curve that can only be discerned upon close examination. The blade is heavy and chisel-edged. It has a unique form in that it is narrowest at the hilt and the gradually broaden to the endpoint.  

The wooden hilt has a very simple shape, without a guard or without a distinguished pommel. Bamboo root is considered to be the best material for the hilt. The grip of the handle is sometimes wrapped with basketry. Sometimes the hilt is decorated with a bronze cap at the bottom. The hilt may also be made of ivory, and occasionally can be well-carved. 

A dao is usually carried in an open-sided wooden scabbard which is fastened to a rattan belt hoop. The scabbard is centrally hollowed out on one face.

Multi-function
The dao is almost the only tool that was used by the Naga and Mizo peoples. It is used for many purposes e.g. for building houses, to clear the forest, to dig the earth, to make the women's weaving tools, and to create any kind of wooden objects. The dao was also used as a weapon in historical warfare.

See also
Dao (Chinese sword)
Dha (sword)
Boti

References

Cited works

 

Southeast Asian swords
Indian swords
Blade weapons